Walter Hudson "Billy" Watkins (February 23, 1878 – April 6, 1937) was an American football coach.  He served as the head football coach at Auburn University from 1900 to 1901, compiling a record of 6–3–1. He also coached the Vanderbilt Commodores for two seasons from 1901 to 1902, compiling a record of 14–2–1. Watkins attended Princeton University, where he was a prominent member of the baseball team and first substitute on the football team. He later worked as an attorney.

Head coaching record

References

External links

1878 births
1937 deaths
Auburn Tigers football coaches
Princeton Tigers baseball players
Princeton Tigers football players
Vanderbilt Commodores football coaches
Sportspeople from Meridian, Mississippi